Feyzollahabad (also Romanized as Feyz̤ollahābād) is a village in Babol Kenar Rural District, Babol Kenar District, Babol County, Mazandaran Province, Iran. At the 2006 census, its population was 45, in 12 families.

References 

Populated places in Babol County